Scandale is a town and commune, in Calabria, southern Italy, formerly the see of the Diocese of San Leone.

Scandale may also refer to :

 Scandale Beck, a hill in Britain's Lake District National Park
 Scandale (company), a French clothing designer

 Arts and music
 Scandale (film), 1982 Quebec comedy film
 Scandale, classical album by Alice Sara Ott and Francesco Tristano  (2014) 
 Scandale Records, label of Sexy Sushi and other bands
 The French title of the 2019 American documentary film Bombshell.